The Gathering of the spiritual or the Council of Wise Men (also called Civata Ruhanî or Meclisa Ruhanî) is a council made up of Yazidi dignitaries that deals with the religious and secular affairs of the Yazidis.

Meetings 
The meetings are traditionally held in Lalish. All Yazidi leading clerics from Sheikhan, some Yazidi tribal leaders and some Yazidi village elders also occasionally attend the meetings.

References 

Yazidi society